This is a list of species in the plant genus Solanum. There may be as many as 1,500 species worldwide. With some 1240 accepted specific and infra-specific taxa of the more than 4,000 described, the genus Solanum contains more species than any other genus in the family Solanaceae and it is one of the largest among the angiosperms.

Phylogenetic analysis of molecular data has established or confirmed that the genera Lycopersicon, Cyphomandra, Normania, and Triguera, which were previously classified independently, should in reality be included within the Solanum. In fact, all the species from these four genera have been formally transferred to Solanum. On the other hand, the genus Lycianthes, which is sometimes included within the Solanum, has been shown to be a separate genus.

The following alphabetical list of Solanum species provides the binomial name followed by the name of the species authority, abbreviated according to the appropriate conventions and uses.

The tuberous species within the genus (those related to Solanum tuberosum, the potato, and therefore often called wild potatoes) have been indicated with the letter T. The nothospecies belonging to the genus appear at the end of the list, that is those taxa that have originated from a hybrid between two different species (for example, Solanum × viirsooi, which has been shown to be an interspecific hybrid resulting from the cross between S. acaule and  S. infundibuliforme.)

A 

Solanum abancayense Ochoa
Solanum abbotianum Juz.
Solanum abitaguense S.Knapp
Solanum abollatum H.St.John
Solanum abortivum Symon
Solanum abutilifolium Rusby
Solanum abutiloides (Griseb.) Bitter & Lillo
Solanum acanthodapis A.R.Bean
Solanum acanthodes Hook.f.
T Solanum acaule Bitter
Solanum acayucense Sessé & Moc.
Solanum accrescens Standl. & C.V.Morton
Solanum accrescens Standl. & C.V.Morton
Solanum acerifolium Dunal
Solanum acetosaefolium Lam.
T Solanum achacachense M.Cárdenas.
Solanum achorum S.R. Stern, 2010  
T Solanum acroglossum Juz.
Solanum acropterum Griseb.
T Solanum acroscopicum Ochoa
Solanum actaeabotrys Rusby
Solanum actephilum Guillaumin
Solanum aculeastrum Dunal
Solanum aculeatissimum Jacq.
Solanum aculeolatum M.Martens & Galeotti
Solanum aculeatissimum Jacq.
Solanum aculeolatum M.Martens & Galeotti
Solanum acuminatum Ruiz & Pav.
Solanum acutilobum Dunal
Solanum adelense Delile
Solanum adenophorum F.Muell.
Solanum adoense Hochst. ex A.Rich.
Solanum adscendens Sendtn. – Sonoita nightshade
Solanum adspersum Witasek
Solanum aethiopicum L.
Solanum affine Sendtn.
Solanum africanum Mill.
Solanum agrarium Sendtn.
T Solanum agrimoniifolium Rydb.
T Solanum alandiae Cárdenas
Solanum alatirameum Bitter
T Solanum albicans (Ochoa) Ochoa.
Solanum albidum Dunal
T Solanum albornozii Correll.
Solanum aldabrense C.H.Wright
Solanum aligerum Schltdl.
Solanum alliariifolium M. Nee & Särkinen, 2015 
Solanum allophyllum (Miers) Standl.
Solanum aloysiifolium Dunal
Solanum alphonsei Dunal .
Solanum alternatopinnatum Steud.
Solanum altissimum Benitez.
T Solanum amayanum Ochoa.
Solanum amblophyllum Hook.
Solanum amblycalyx Dunal.
Solanum amblymerum Dunal.
T Solanum ambosinum Ochoa.
Solanum americanum Mill. – American nightshade, American black nightshade, glossy nightshade
Solanum ammophilum A.R.Bean.
Solanum amnicola S.Knapp
Solanum amorimii S. Knapp & Giacomin, 2015 
Solanum amotapense Svenson
Solanum amygdalifolium Steud.
T Solanum anamatophilum Ochoa.
Solanum anceps Ruiz & Pav.
T Solanum ancophilum (Correll) Ochoa.
T Solanum ancoripae Ochoa.
T Solanum andreanum Baker.
Solanum anfractum Symon
Solanum anguivi Lam.
Solanum angustialatum Bitter
Solanum angustifidum Bitter
Solanum angustifolium Mill.
Solanum angustum Domin
Solanum anisophyllum Van Heurck & Müll.Arg.
Solanum annuum C.V.Morton
Solanum anoacanthum Sendtn.
Solanum anomalum Thonn.
Solanum antisuyo Särkinen & S. Knapp, 2015 
Solanum apaporanum R.E.Schult.
Solanum aparadense Mentz & M.Nee
Solanum aphyodendron S.Knapp
Solanum apiahyense Witasek
Solanum apiculatum Sendtn.
Solanum appendiculatum Dunal
Solanum appressum K.E. Roe
Solanum arachnidanthum Rusby
Solanum arboreum Dunal
Solanum arcanum Peralta – "wild tomato"
Solanum arenarium Sendtn.
Solanum arenicola Särkinen & P. Gonzáles, 2015
Solanum argenteum Dunal .
Solanum argentinum Bitter & Lillo
Solanum argopetalum A.R.Bean
Solanum aridum Morong
Solanum armentalis J.L.Gentry & D'Arcy Ann.
Solanum armourense A.R.Bean
Solanum arundo Mattei Boll.
Solanum ashbyae Symon
Solanum asperolanatum Ruiz & Pav.
Solanum asperum Rich. Actes
Solanum asterophorum Mart.
Solanum asteropilodes Bitter
Solanum asymmetriphyllum Specht
Solanum athenae Symon
Solanum atitlanum K.E. Roe
Solanum atropurpureum Schrank
Solanum aturense Dunal
Solanum aureitomentosum Bitter
Solanum aureum Dunal
Solanum aviculare G.Forst. – poroporo (New Zealand), kangaroo apple (Australia)
Solanum axillifolium K.E. Roe
T Solanum ayacuchense Ochoa.
T  Solanum aymaraesense Ochoa.

B

Solanum bahamense L.
Solanum bahianum S.Knapp
Solanum barbeyanum Huber
Solanum barbisetum Nees
Solanum barbulatum Zahlbr.
Solanum baretiae
Solanum basendopogon Bitter
Solanum batoides D'Arcy & Rakot.
Solanum bauerianum Endl.
Solanum beaugleholei Symon
Solanum bellicosum Bitter
Solanum bellum S.Knapp
Solanum benadirense Chiov.
Solanum benderianum Schimp. ex Engl.
Solanum benderianum Schimp. ex Engl.
Solanum beniense de Wild.
Solanum bequaertii de Wild.
T Solanum berthaultii Hawkes.
Solanum betaceum Cav. – tree tomato, tamarillo
Solanum betroka D'Arcy & Rakot.
Solanum bicolor Willd. ex Roem. & Schult.
Solanum bistellatum L.B.Sm. & Downs
Solanum boldoense Dunal & A.DC.
Solanum bolivianum Britt. ex Rusby
T  Solanum boliviense Dunal. A. L. P. P. de Candolle
Solanum bonariense L.
Solanum borgmannii Symon
Solanum brachyantherum Phil.
 Solanum brachistotrichum (Bitter) Rydb.
Solanum bradei Giacomin & Stehmann, 2014 
T Solanum brevicaule Bitter.
Solanum brevifolium Dunal
Solanum brevipedicellatum K.E. Roe
Solanum brownii Dunal
Solanum buddleiaefolium Sendtn.
T Solanum bukasovii Juz. ex Rybin. 
T Solanum bulbocastanum Dunal – ornamental nightshade
Solanum bullatum Vell.
Solanum bumeliaefolium Dunal
Solanum burchellii Dunal
T Solanum burkartii Ochoa
Solanum burtonii Ochoa

C 

Solanum caavurana Vell.
Solanum cacosmum Bohs
Solanum caelicola Giacomin & Stehmann, 2013 
T Solanum caesium Griseb.
Solanum cajanumense Kunth
T Solanum cajamarquense Ochoa.
T Solanum calacalinum Ochoa.
Solanum caldense Carvalho
Solanum calidum Bohs
Solanum calileguae Cabrera
Solanum callianthum C.V.Morton
T Solanum calvescens Bitter.
Solanum campaniforme Roem. & Schult.
Solanum campanulatum R.Br.
Solanum campanuliflorum C.H.Wright
Solanum campechiense L.
Solanum camptostylum Bitter
Solanum campylacanthum Hochst. ex A.Rich.
T Solanum candidum Lindl.
Solanum canense Rydb.
Solanum canoasense L.B.Sm. & Downs
Solanum capense L.
Solanum capillipes Britton
Solanum capsiciforme (Domin) Baylis
T Solanum capsicoides All.
Solanum carautae Carvalho
T Solanum cardiophyllum Lindl. – heart-leaved nightshade, heartleaf horsenettle
Solanum carduiforme Mueller
Solanum caricaefolium Rusby
T Solanum caripense Dunal
T Solanum carolinense L. – horsenettle, Carolina horsenettle
Solanum cassioides L.B.Sm. & Downs
Solanum castaneum Carvalho
Solanum cataphractum A.Cunn. ex Benth.
Solanum catilliflorum G.J.Anderson, Martine, Prohens & Nuez
Solanum catombelense Peyr.
Solanum celatum A.R.Bean
Solanum celsum Standl. & C.V.Morton
Solanum centrale J.M.Black – bush tomato (central Australia)
Solanum cerasiferum Dunal
T Solanum cernuum Vell.
T Solanum chacoense Bitter.
Solanum chaetophorum C.V.Morton
Solanum chalmersii S.Knapp
Solanum chamaeacanthum Griseb.
Solanum chamaepolybotryon Bitter
Solanum chamaesarachidium Bitter
Solanum cheesmaniae (L.Riley) Fosberg
Solanum chenopodinum Mueller
Solanum chenopodioides Lam. – goosefoot nightshade, slender nightshade (including S. gracilius)
Solanum chiapasense K.E.Roe
Solanum chilense (Dunal) Reiche
Solanum chilliasense Ochoa
Solanum chimborazense Bitter & Sodiro
Solanum chippendalei Symon
Solanum chlamydogynum Bitter
Solanum chmielewskii (C.M.Rick, Kesicki, Fobes & M.Holle) D.M.Spooner, G.J.Anderson & R.K.Jansen.
Solanum chrysasteroides Werderm.
Solanum chrysotrichum Schltdl.
Solanum cinereum R.Br.
Solanum cinnamomeum Sendtn.
Solanum circaeifolium Bitter
T Solanum circinatum Bohs.
Solanum citrinum M.Nee
T Solanum citrullifolium A.Braun
Solanum citrullifolium A.Braun .
Solanum cladotrichum Dunal
Solanum clandestinum Bohs
Solanum clarkiae Symon
T Solanum clarum Correll
Solanum cleistogamum Symon
Solanum clivorum S.Knapp
Solanum coactiliferum J.M.Black
Solanum coagulans Forssk.
Solanum coalitum S.Knapp
Solanum cobanense J.L.Gentry
Solanum coccineum Jacq.
Solanum cochabambense Bitter .
Solanum cochoae G.J.Anderson & Bernardello
Solanum cocosoides A.R.Bean
Solanum comarapanum M.Nee
T Solanum commersonii Dunal – Commerson's nightshade
Solanum complectens M.Nee & G.J.Anderson
Solanum compressum L.B.Sm. & Downs
Solanum concarense Hunz.
Solanum concinnum Schott ex Sendtn.
Solanum confertiseriatum Bitter
Solanum confine Dunal in DC.
Solanum confusum C.V.Morton
Solanum conglobatum Dunal in DC.
Solanum conicum Ruiz & Pav.
Solanum conocarpum L.C.Rich. ex Dunal – marron bacoba
Solanum consimile C.V.Morton
Solanum cookii Symon
Solanum coquimbense J.R.Benn.
Solanum coracinum Symon
Solanum cordatum Forssk.
Solanum cordicitum S.R. Stern, 2014 
Solanum cordifolium Dunal
Solanum cordioides S.Knapp
Solanum cordovense Sessé & Moc.
Solanum coriaceum Dunal
Solanum corifolium Mueller
Solanum corneliomulleri J.F.Macbr.
Solanum cornifolium Dunal
Solanum corumbense S.Moore
Solanum corymbiflorum (Sendtn.) Bohs
Solanum corymbosum Jacq.
Solanum costatum M.Nee
Solanum cowiei Martine
Solanum crassitomentosum Domin
Solanum crebrispinum A.R.Bean
Solanum crebrum C.V.Morton & L.B.Sm.
Solanum cremastanthemum Werderm.
Solanum crinitipes Dunal
Solanum crinitum Lam.
Solanum crispum Ruiz & Pav. – Chilean potato vine, Chilean nightshade, Chilean potato tree
Solanum croatii D'Arcy & R.C.Keating
Solanum crotonifolium Dunal
Solanum crotonoides Lam.
Solanum cruciferum Bitter
Solanum cucullatum S.Knapp
Solanum cunninghamii Benth.
Solanum curvicuspe Domin
Solanum cutervanum Zahlbr.
Solanum cyaneopurpureum de Wild.
Solanum cyclophyllum S.Knapp
Solanum cylindricum Vell.
Solanum cymbalarifolium Chiov.

D 

Solanum dallmannianum Warb.
Solanum damarense Bitter
Solanum dammerianum Lauterb. & K.Schum.
Solanum daphnophyllum Bitter
Solanum darienense S.Knapp
Solanum dasyadenium Bitter
Solanum dasyanthum Brandegee
Solanum dasyneuron S.Knapp
Solanum dasyphyllum Schumach. & Thonn.
Solanum davidsei Carvalho
Solanum davisense Whalen. – Davis' horsenettle
Solanum decompositiflorum Sendtn.
Solanum decorum Sendtn.
Solanum defensum Mueller
Solanum deflexicarpum C. Y. Wu & S. C. Huang
Solanum deflexiflorum Bitter .
Solanum deflexum Greenm.
Solanum delagoense Dunal in DC
Solanum delicatulum L.B.Sm. & Downs
Solanum delitescens C.V.Morton
T Solanum demissum Lindl. – dwarf wild potato
Solanum dendroicum O.E.Schulz & Ekman
Solanum dennekense Dammer
Solanum denseaculeatum Symon .
Solanum densevestitum Mueller ex Benth.
Solanum densepilosulum Bitter
Solanum depauperatum Dunal
Solanum diamantinense M.F.Agra.
Solanum dianthophorum Dunal
Solanum dianthum Rusby
Solanum dichroandrum Dunal
Solanum didymum Dunal
Solanum dimidiatum Raf. – western horsenettle
Solanum dimorphandrum S.Knapp
Solanum dimorphispinum C. White.
Solanum dinteri Bitter
Solanum dioicum W. Fitzg.
Solanum diphyllum L. – twin-leaved nightshade
Solanum diploconos (Mart.) Bohs
Solanum discolor R.Br.
Solanum dissectum Symon
Solanum dissimile C.V.Morton
Solanum distichophyllum Sendtn.
Solanum distichum Schumach. & Thonn.
Solanum ditrichum A.R.Bean
Solanum diversiflorum Mueller
Solanum diversifolium Dunal
T Solanum dolichocremastrum Bitter.
Solanum dolichorhachis Bitter
Solanum dolichosepalum Bitter
Solanum dolosum S.Knapp
T Solanum donachui (Ochoa) Ochoa.
Solanum donianum Walp. – mullein nightshade
Solanum douglasii Dunal – green-spotted nightshade
Solanum dryanderense A.R.Bean
Solanum dulcamara L. – bittersweet
Solanum dulcamaroides Dunal
Solanum dumicola A.R.Bean
Solanum dunalianum Gaudich.
Solanum dysprosium A.R.Bean

E 

Solanum eardleyae Symon
Solanum eburneum Symon
Solanum echegarayi Hieron.
Solanum echinatum R.Br.
Solanum edmonstonei Hook.f.
T Solanum ehrenbergii (Bitter) Rydb.
Solanum elachophyllum Mueller
Solanum elaeagnifolium Cav. – silverleaf nightshade
Solanum elegans Dunal
Solanum ellipticum R.Br.
Solanum eminens A.R.Bean
Solanum endoadenium Bitter
Solanum endopogon (Bitter) Bohs
Solanum ensifolium Dunal
Solanum eremophilum Mueller
Solanum erianthum D.Don – potato tree, mullein nightshade
Solanum erosomarginatum S.Knapp
Solanum erythracanthum Dunal
Solanum erythrotrichum Fernald
Solanum esuriale Lindl.
T Solanum etuberosum Lindl.
Solanum euacanthum Phil.
Solanum evolvulifolium Greenm.
Solanum evolvuloides Giacomin & StehmannSolanum evonymoides Sendtn. in Mart.Solanum excisirhombeum BitterSolanum exiguum BohsSolanum expedunculatum Symon

FSolanum falconense S.KnappSolanum fallax BohsSolanum felinum Bitter ex WhalenSolanum fernandesii V. S. Sampaio & R. Moura, 2016 
T Solanum fernandezianum Phil.Solanum ferocissimum Lindl.Solanum ferox L. – hairy-fruited eggplant, Thai hairy-fruited eggplantSolanum ferrugineum Jacq.Solanum fervens A.R.BeanSolanum fiebrigii BitterSolanum filiforme Ruiz & Pav.Solanum filirhachis Giacomin & Stehmann, 2015Solanum flaccidum Vell.Solanum flagellare Sendtn.Solanum flagelliferum Baker
T Solanum flahaultii Bitter.Solanum florulentum BitterSolanum foetens Pittier ex S.KnappSolanum forskalii DunalSolanum fortunense BohsSolanum fosbergianumSolanum francisii A.R.BeanSolanum fraxinifolium DunalSolanum friburgense Giacomin & Stehmann, 2014 Solanum fructu-tecto Cav.Solanum fulgens (J.F.Macbr.) RoeSolanum fulvidum BitterSolanum furcatum Dunal – forked nightshadeSolanum furfuraceum R.Br.Solanum fusiforme L.B.Sm. & Downs

GSolanum gabrielae DominSolanum galapagense S.C.Darwin & PeraltaSolanum galbinum A.R.BeanSolanum galpinii BitterSolanum gardneri Sendtn.Solanum gemellum Mart. ex Sendtn.Solanum georgicum R.E.Schult.Solanum gertii S.KnappSolanum gibbsiae J.R.Drumm.Solanum giganteum Jacq.Solanum gilesii Symon Trans.Solanum gilioides RusbySolanum glaberrimum C.V.Morton .Solanum glabratum Dunal Solanum glaucescens Zucc.Solanum glaucophyllum Desf.Solanum glutinosum DunalSolanum gnaphalocarpon Vell.Solanum goetzei DammerSolanum gomphodes Dunal in DCSolanum goniocaulon S.KnappSolanum gonocladum Dunal in DCSolanum gonyrhachis S.KnappSolanum goodspeedii K.E.Roe
T Solanum gourlayi Hawkes.Solanum grandiflorum Ruiz & Pav.Solanum graniticum A.R.BeanSolanum granuloso-leprosum DunalSolanum gratum BitterSolanum graveolens BunburySolanum grayi Rose vars. grandiflorum (basal) and grayi (smaller-flowered in sympatry with Solanum lumholtzianum)Solanum guamense Merrill Philipp.Solanum guaraniticum St.-Hil.Solanum guerreroense CorrellSolanum guineense L.Solanum gundlachii Urb.
T Solanum guzmanguense Whalen & Sagást.Solanum gympiense Symon

HSolanum habrocaulon S.KnappSolanum habrochaites S.Knapp & D.M.SpoonerSolanum hamulosum C.T.WhiteSolanum hapalum A.R.BeanSolanum harmandii BonatiSolanum hasslerianum ChodatSolanum hastatilobum Bitter .Solanum hastifolium Hochst. ex Dunal
T Solanum hastiforme Correll.Solanum havanense Jacq.Solanum hayesii FernaldSolanum hazenii Britton Bull.Solanum heinianum D'Arcy & R.C.KeatingSolanum heiseri G.J.AndersonSolanum heleonastes S.KnappSolanum herbabona ReicheSolanum herculeum BohsSolanum hesperium SymonSolanum heteracanthum DunalSolanum heterodoxum DunalSolanum heterodoxum DunalSolanum heterodoxum DunalSolanum heterodoxum DunalSolanum heteropodium SymonSolanum hexandrum Vell.Solanum hibernum BohsSolanum hidetaroi Masam.Solanum hindsianum Benth. – Hinds' nightshade
T Solanum hintonii CorrellSolanum hirtellum (Spreng.) Hassl.Solanum hirtum Vahl Symb.
T Solanum hjertingii Hawkes.Solanum hoehnei C.V.Morton
T Solanum hoopesii Hawkes & K. A. Okada.Solanum hoplopetalum Bitter & Summerh.Solanum horridum DunalSolanum hotteanum Urb. & Ekman
T Solanum hougasii CorrellSolanum houstonii MartynSolanum hovei DunalSolanum huayavillenseSolanum huaylasense PeraltaSolanum hugonis HeineSolanum humblotii DammerSolanum humboldtianum Granados-Tochoy & S.KnappSolanum humile Lam. .Solanum hutchisonii (J.F.Macbr.) Bohs
T Solanum hypacrarthrum Bitter.Solanum hypaleurotrichum BitterSolanum hypermegethes Werderm.Solanum hypocalycosarcum BitterSolanum hyporhodium A.Braun & Solanum hystrix R.Br.

 I Solanum iltisii K.E.RoeSolanum imamense DunalSolanum imbaburense S.KnappSolanum imberbe Bitter
T Solanum immite Dunal. A.DC.Solanum inaequilaterale Merrill Philipp.Solanum inaequilaterum DominSolanum inaequiradians Werderm.Solanum incanoalabastrum Symon
T Solanum incahuasinum Ochoa.Solanum incanum L.Solanum incarceratum Ruiz & Pav.Solanum incisum Griseb.Solanum incompletum DunalSolanum incomptum BitterSolanum incurvum Ruiz & Pav.Solanum indivisum Witasek ex J.R.Benn.Solanum inelegans Rusby Mem.
T Solanum infundibuliforme Phil.Solanum infuscatum SymonSolanum innoxium A.R.BeanSolanum inodorum Vell.Solanum insidiosum Mart.Solanum insulae-paschalis BitterSolanum insulae-pinorum HeineSolanum interandinum BitterSolanum intermedium Sendtn.Solanum intonsum A.R.BeanSolanum involucratum BlumeSolanum iodotrichum Van Heurck & Müll.Arg.Solanum ionidium Bitter
T Solanum iopetalum (Bitter) HawkesSolanum irregulare C.V.MortonSolanum ivohibe D'Arcy & Rakot.

JSolanum jabrense Agra & M.NeeSolanum jamaicense Mill.
T Solanum jamesii Torr. – wild potatoSolanum johnsonianum A.R.BeanSolanum johnstonii WhalenSolanum jubae BitterSolanum jucundum A.R.BeanSolanum juglandifolium DunalSolanum julocrotonoides Hassl.Solanum juncalense ReicheSolanum junctum S.R. Stern & M. Nee, 2014 Solanum jussiaei DunalSolanum juvenale Thell.

KSolanum kagehense DammerSolanum karsense SymonSolanum keniense TurrillSolanum kitagawae Schönb.-Tem.Solanum kitivuense DammerSolanum kleinii L.B.Sm. & DownsSolanum knappiae Agra & V. S. Sampaio, 2016 Solanum kriegeri Giacomin & Stehmann, 2014 
T Solanum kurtzianum Bitter & Wittm.Solanum kurzii Brace ex PrainSolanum kwebense N.E.Br. ex C.H.Wright

LSolanum lacerdae DusénSolanum lachneion DammerSolanum lachnophyllum SymonSolanum laciniatum AitonSolanum lacunarium MuellerSolanum laevigatum DunalSolanum lamprocarpum BitterSolanum lanceifolium Jacq.Solanum lanceolatum Cav.Solanum lanzae J.-P.Lebrun & StorkSolanum lasiocarpum Dunal – Indian nightshadeSolanum lasiocladum S.KnappSolanum lasiophyllum DunalSolanum lasiopodium DunalSolanum latens A.R.BeanSolanum latiflorum BohsSolanum laurifrons BitterSolanum laxum Spreng. – jasmine nightshade Solanum leiophyllum Benth.Solanum leopoldensis SymonSolanum lepidotum DunalSolanum leptacanthum Merrill & L.M.PerrySolanum leptocaulon Van Heurck & Müll.Arg.Solanum leptopodum Van Heurck & Müll.Arg.Solanum leptorhachis BitterSolanum leptostachys Dunal
T Solanum lesteri Hawkes & Hjert.Solanum leucandrum WhalenSolanum leucocarpon DunalSolanum leucodendron Sendtn.Solanum leucopogon HuberSolanum lianoides ElmerSolanum lichtensteinii Willd.Solanum lidii SundingSolanum lignescens FernaldSolanum limitare A.R.BeanSolanum lindenii RusbySolanum linearifolium Geras. ex SymonSolanum linnaeanum Hepper & P.-M.L.JaegerSolanum litoraneum A.E.Gonç.Solanum lobbianum BitterSolanum longestamineum DammerSolanum longevirgatum Bitter
T Solanum longiconicum BitterSolanum longifilamentum Särkinen & P. Gonzáles, 2015 Solanum longissimum A.R.BeanSolanum lorentzii BitterSolanum loxophyllum BitterSolanum lucani MuellerSolanum lucens S.KnappSolanum lumholtzianum Bartlett – Sonoran nightshadeSolanum luridifuscescens BitterSolanum luteoalbum Pers. (including S. semicoalitum)Solanum luzoniense MerrillSolanum lycocarpum St.-Hil. – wolf apple, fruta-de-lobo, lobeira (Brazil)Solanum lycopersicoides Dunal – Peruvian wolfpeachSolanum lycopersicum L. – tomatoSolanum lyratum Thunb.Solanum lythrocarpum A.R.Bean

MSolanum macaonense DunalSolanum macbridei Hunz. & LallanaSolanum macoorai F.M.BaileySolanum macracanthum A.Rich.Solanum macrocarpon L.Solanum macrothyrsum DammerSolanum macrotonum BitterSolanum madagascariense DunalSolanum maestrense Urb.
T Solanum maglia Schltdl.Solanum magnifolium MuellerSolanum mahoriense D'Arcy & Rakot.Solanum malacothrix S.KnappSolanum malletii S.KnappSolanum mammosum L.Solanum mankiense SymonSolanum mapiricum S.KnappSolanum mapiriense BitterSolanum maranguapense BitterSolanum marantifolium BitterSolanum marginatum L.f.Solanum mariae Särkinen & S. Knapp, 2015Solanum matadori Smith & DownsSolanum maternum BohsSolanum maturecalvans BitterSolanum mauense BitterSolanum mauritianum Scop. – woolly nightshade, ear-leaved nightshade, flannel weed, bugweed, tobacco weed, kerosene plant, "wild tobacco" (Australia)Solanum megalochiton Mart.Solanum megalonyx Sendtn.
T Solanum megistacrolobum Bitter.Solanum melanospermum MuellerSolanum melastomoides C.H.WrightSolanum melissarum BohsSolanum melongena L. EggplantSolanum memphiticum J.F.Gmel.Solanum mentiens A.R.BeanSolanum merrillianum LiouSolanum mesopliarthrum Rojas & Steyerm.Solanum metarsium C.V.MortonSolanum michaelis  Särkinen & S. Knapp, 2016 
T Solanum microdontum Bitter.Solanum microleprodes BitterSolanum microphyllum (Lam.) DunalSolanum minutifoliolum CorrellSolanum miragoanae Urb.Solanum missimense SymonSolanum mitchellianum DominSolanum mite Ruiz & Pav.Solanum mitlense DunalSolanum moense Britton & WilsonSolanum monachophyllum DunalSolanum monadelphum Van Heurck & Müll.Arg.Solanum monanthemon S.KnappSolanum monarchostemon S.KnappSolanum monotanthum DammerSolanum montanum L.Solanum morellifolium Bohs
T Solanum morelliforme Bitter & MünchSolanum morii S.KnappSolanum mortonii Hunz.Solanum moxosense M.NeeSolanum muansense DammerSolanum muenscheri Standl. & Steyerm.Solanum multifidum Lam.Solanum multiglandulosum BitterSolanum multiglochidiatum DominSolanum multispinum N.E.Br.Solanum multivenosum SymonSolanum muricatum Aiton Hort. – pepino dulce, pepino melon, melon pear, "pepino", "tree melon"Solanum myoxotrichum BakerSolanum myriacanthum DunalSolanum myrsinoides D'Arcy & Rakot.

 N Solanum nakurense C.H.WrightSolanum namaquense DammerSolanum narcoticosmum BitterSolanum naucinum S.KnappSolanum nava Webb & Berthel.Solanum neei Chiarini & L.A. MentzSolanum nelsonii Dunal – Nelson's horsenettleSolanum nematorhachis S.KnappSolanum nemophilum MuellerSolanum nemorense DunalSolanum neoanglicum A.R.Bean
T Solanum neocardenasii Hawkes & Hjert.Solanum neorickii D.M.Spooner, G.J.Anderson & R.K.JansenSolanum nienkui Merrill & ChunSolanum nigrescens M.Martens & Galeotti – divine nightshadeSolanum nigricans M.Martens & GaleottiSolanum nigriviolaceum BitterSolanum nigrum L. – European black nightshade, "black nightshade"Solanum nitidum Ruiz & Pav.Solanum nobile A.R.BeanSolanum nolense SymonSolanum nossibeense VatkeSolanum nudum Dunal – forest nightshadeSolanum nummularium S.MooreSolanum nuricum M.NeeSolanum nutans Ruiz & Pav.

 O Solanum obliquum Ruiz & Pav.Solanum oblongifolium DunalSolanum oblongum Ruiz & Pav.Solanum obovalifolium BenitezSolanum occultum BohsSolanum ochrancanthum BitterSolanum ochranthum DunalSolanum ochrophyllum Van Heurck & Müll.Arg.Solanum odoriferum Vell.Solanum oedipus Symon
T Solanum okadae Hawkes & Hjert.Solanum oldfieldii MuellerSolanum oligacanthum MuellerSolanum oligandrum SymonSolanum oliveirae CarvalhoSolanum ombrophilum Pittier ex S.KnappSolanum oocarpum Sendtn.Solanum opacum A.Braun & Bouché .Solanum oppositifolium Ruiz & Pav.Solanum orbiculatum DunalSolanum orbiculatum Dunal
T Solanum oplocense Hawkes.Solanum orthacanthum O.E.SchulzSolanum ovalifolium DunalSolanum ovum-fringillae (Dunal) BohsSolanum oxycarpum SchiedeSolanum oxyphyllum C.V.Morton

 P Solanum pabstii L.B.Sm. & DownsSolanum pachimatium DunalSolanum pachyandrum BitterSolanum pachyneuroides AmshoffSolanum pachyneurum O.E.SchulzSolanum palinacanthum Dunal .Solanum palitans C.V.MortonSolanum pallidum RusbySolanum palmeri Vasey & RoseSolanum palmillae Standl.Solanum paludosum Moric.Solanum palustre Schltdl.Solanum pampaninii Chiov.Solanum pancheri GuillauminSolanum panduriforme E.Mey.Solanum paniculatum L.Solanum papaverifolium SymonSolanum paposanum Phil.Solanum papuanum SymonSolanum paraibanum AgraSolanum paralum BohsSolanum paranense DusénSolanum parishii Heller – Parish's nightshadeSolanum parvifolium R.Br.Solanum pastillum S.KnappSolanum paucijugum BitterSolanum pauperum C.H.WrightSolanum pectinatum DunalSolanum pedemontanum M.NeeSolanum pedersenii CabreraSolanum peekelii BitterSolanum peikuoense S.S.YingSolanum pelagicum BohsSolanum pendulum Ruiz & Pav.Solanum pennellii CorrellSolanum pereirae CarvalhoSolanum perlongistylum G.J.Anderson, Martine, Prohens & NuezSolanum pertenue Standl. & C.V.MortonSolanum peruvianum L. – Peruvian nightshade, "wild tomato"Solanum petraeum SymonSolanum petrophilum MuellerSolanum phaseoloides Pol.Solanum phlomoides A.Cunn. ex Benth.Solanum phureja Juz. & Bukasov.Solanum physalifolium Rusby (Solanum sarrachoides auct.) – hairy nightshadeSolanum pilcomayense MorongSolanum piluliferum DunalSolanum pimpinellifolium L. – currant tomatoSolanum pinetorum (L.B.Sm. & Downs) Bohs .Solanum pinnatisectum Dunal – tansy-leaved nightshadeSolanum pinnatum Cav.Solanum piperiferum A.Rich.Solanum pittosporifolium Hemsl.Solanum placitum C.V.MortonSolanum platacanthum DunalSolanum platense Diekm.Solanum platycypellon S.Knapp .Solanum plicatile (S.Moore) SymonSolanum plowmanii S.KnappSolanum plumense FernaldSolanum pluviale Standl.Solanum poinsettiifolium RusbySolanum polyacanthon Lam.Solanum polyadenium Greenm.Solanum polygamum Vahl – cakalaka berrySolanum polytrichum Moric.Solanum praetermissum Kerr ex BarnettSolanum premnifolium (Miers) BohsSolanum prinophyllum DunalSolanum proteanthum BohsSolanum pseuderanthemoides Schltr.Solanum pseudoamericanum Särkinen, P. Gonzáles & S. Knapp, 2013Solanum pseudoauriculatum Chodat & Hassl.Solanum pseudocapsicum L. – Jerusalem cherry, Madeira winter cherry, "winter cherry" (including S. capsicastrum)Solanum pseudodaphnopsis L.A. Mentz & StehmannSolanum pseudogracile Heiser – Glowing nightshadeSolanum pseudolulo HeiserSolanum pseudoquina St.-Hil. (including S. inaequale Vell.)Solanum psilophyllum Stehmann & Giacomin, 2015Solanum psychotrioides DunalSolanum ptychanthum Dunal – West Indian nightshade, eastern black nightshadeSolanum pubescens Willd.Solanum pubigerum DunalSolanum pugiunculiferum C.T.WhiteSolanum pulverulentifolium K.E. Roe.Solanum pumilum DunalSolanum punctulatum DunalSolanum pungetium R.Br.Solanum pusillum A.R.BeanSolanum pycnanthemum Mart.Solanum pygmaeum Cav.Solanum pyracanthos Lam.Solanum pyrifolium Lam.

QSolanum quadriloculatum MuellerSolanum quaesitum C.V.Morton ex Gleason & A.C.Sm.Solanum quebradense S.KnappSolanum quitoense Lam.

RSolanum racemosum Jacq.Solanum radicans L.f.Solanum ramonense C.V.Morton & Standl.Solanum ramulosum Sendtn.Solanum reductum C.V.MortonSolanum refractifolium Sendtn.Solanum refractum Hook. & Arn.Solanum regularifolium CorrellSolanum reineckii Briq.Solanum reitzii L.B.Sm. & DownsSolanum remyanum Phil.Solanum repandum G.Forst.Solanum reptans BunburySolanum restingae S.KnappSolanum retroflexum Dunal – wonderberry, sunberrySolanum retrorsum ElmerSolanum rhizomatum Särkinen & M. Nee, 2015
T Solanum rhomboideilanceolatum Ochoa.Solanum rhytidoandrum Sendtn.Solanum richardii DunalSolanum riedlei Dunal – Riedle's nightshadeSolanum rigescentoides Hutch.Solanum rigidum Lam. .Solanum riojense BitterSolanum riparium Pers.Solanum ripense DunalSolanum rivicola SymonSolanum rixosum A.R.BeanSolanum robinsonii BonatiSolanum roblense BitterSolanum robustifrons BitterSolanum robustum H.L.Wendl.Solanum rojasianum (Standl. & Steyerm.) BohsSolanum roseum BohsSolanum rostratum Dunal (seeds of which were ordered by Charles Darwin approx. 10 days prior to his death)Solanum rovirosanum Donn. Sm.Solanum rubetorum DunalSolanum rubicaule S.R. Stern, 2010 Solanum rubiginosum VahlSolanum rudepannum Dunal Solanum rufescens Sendtn.Solanum rugosum Dunal – tabacon asperoSolanum ruizii S.KnappSolanum runsoriense C.H.WrightSolanum rupincola Sendtn.

SSolanum sagittantherum Granados-Tochoy & C.I. OrozcoSolanum sakhanii Hul, 2013 Solanum salamancae Hunz. & BarbozaSolanum sambiranense D'Arcy & Rakot.Solanum sanctaecatharinae DunalSolanum sandwicense Hook. & Arn. – Hawaii horsenettleSolanum santosii S.KnappSolanum saponaceum DunalSolanum sarrachoides Sendtn.Solanum saruwagedensis SymonSolanum saturatum M.NeeSolanum savanillense BitterSolanum scabrum Mill. – garden huckleberrySolanum scalarium Martine & T.M.Williams – Garrarnawun bush tomatoSolanum schefferi MuellerSolanum schenckii BitterSolanum schimperianum Hochst. ex A.Rich.Solanum schlechtendalianum Walp.Solanum schliebenii Werderm.Solanum schomburghii Sendtn.Solanum schulzianum Urb.Solanum schumannianum DammerSolanum schwackei Glaz.Solanum sciadostylis (Sendtn.) BohsSolanum scuticum M.NeeSolanum seaforthianum Andrews – Brazilian nightshadeSolanum sejunctum Kym Brennan, Christopher T. Martine, & David E. Symon – Australian eggplantSolanum selachophyllum BitterSolanum sellovianum Sendtn.Solanum sellowii DunalSolanum semiarmatum MuellerSolanum semotum M.NeeSolanum sendtnerianum Van Heurck & Müll.Arg.Solanum senticosum A.R.BeanSolanum septemlobum BungeSolanum seretii de Wild. Miss. E. Laurent,Solanum serpens A.R.BeanSolanum sessile Ruiz & Pav.Solanum sessiliflorum Dunal in PoirSolanum setaceum DammerSolanum setosissimum Mentz & M.NeeSolanum shirleyanum DominSolanum sibundoyense (Bohs) BohsSolanum sieberi Van Heurck & Müll.Arg.Solanum silvestre A.R.BeanSolanum simile MuellerSolanum sinaicum Boiss.Solanum sinuatiexcisum BitterSolanum sinuatirecurvum BitterSolanum siphonobasis BitterSolanum sisymbriifolium Lam. .Solanum sitiens I.M.Johnst.Solanum skutchii CorrellSolanum smithii S.KnappSolanum sodiroi Bitter (including S. carchiense)Solanum sodomaeodes KuntzeSolanum somalense Franch.Solanum sooretamum CarvalhoSolanum spirale Roxb.Solanum spissifolium Sendtn.Solanum splendens (Dunal) Bohs, 2015 Solanum sporadotrichum MuellerSolanum stagnale Moric.Solanum stellatiglandulosum BitterSolanum stellativelutinum BitterSolanum stellativillosum BitterSolanum stelligerum Sm.Solanum stenandrum Sendtn.Solanum stenophyllidium BitterSolanum stenophyllum DunalSolanum stenopterum A.R.BeanSolanum steyermarkii CarvalhoSolanum stipulaceum Roem. & Schult.Solanum stipulatum Vell.Solanum stoloniferum Schltdl. – tigna potato, Fendler's horsenettleSolanum storkii C.V.Morton & Standl.Solanum stramoniifolium Jacq.Solanum stuckertii Bitter .Solanum stupefactum SymonSolanum sturtianum MuellerSolanum styraciflorum Schltr.Solanum suaveolens Kunth & C.D.BouchéSolanum subinerme Jacq.Solanum sublentum HiernSolanum subrectemunitum BitterSolanum subserratum DunalSolanum subsylvestre L.B.Sm. & DownsSolanum subumbellatum Vell.Solanum subvelutinum Rydb.Solanum sumacaspi S.KnappSolanum superbum S.KnappSolanum supinum DunalSolanum swartzianum Roem. & Schult.Solanum sycocarpum Mart. & Sendtn.Solanum sycophanta DunalSolanum symmetricumSolanum symonii H.Eichler

TSolanum tabacicolor DammerSolanum tabanoense CorrellSolanum tacanense LundellSolanum taeniotrichum CorrellSolanum taitense VatkeSolanum talarense SvensonSolanum tampicense DunalSolanum tanysepalum S.KnappSolanum tarderemotum Bitter
T Solanum tarijense Hawkes.
T Solanum tarnii Hawkes & Hjert.Solanum tegore Aubl.Solanum tenuiflagellatum S.KnappSolanum tenuihamatum BitterSolanum tenuipes Bartlett – Fancy nightshadeSolanum tenuisetosum (Bitter) BohsSolanum tenuispinum RusbySolanum tenuissimum Sendtn.Solanum tepuiense S.KnappSolanum terminale Forssk.Solanum ternatum Ruiz & Pav. (including S. ternifolium)Solanum terraneum SymonSolanum tetramerum DunalSolanum tetrandrum R.Br.Solanum tetrathecum MuellerSolanum tettense KlotzschSolanum thelopodium Sendtn.Solanum thomasiifolium Sendtn.Solanum thorelii BonatiSolanum tobagense (Sandwith) BohsSolanum toldense Mates. & BarbozaSolanum toliaraea D'Arcy & Rakot.Solanum tomentosum L.Solanum torreanum A.E.Gonç.Solanum torricellense BitterSolanum torvoideum Merrill & L.M.PerrySolanum torvum Sw. – turkey berrySolanum tovarii S.KnappSolanum trachycarpum Bitter & SodiroSolanum trachycyphum BitterSolanum trachytrichium BitterSolanum tredecimgranum BitterSolanum trepidans C.H.WrightSolanum tribulosum SchauerSolanum trichoneuron LilloSolanum trichopetiolatum D'Arcy & Rakot.Solanum trichostylum Merrill & L.M.PerrySolanum tricuspidatum Dunal
 T Solanum trifidum CorrellSolanum triflorum Nutt. – cut-leaved nightshadeSolanum trifolium DunalSolanum trilobatum L.Solanum trinominum J.R.Benn.Solanum tripartitum DunalSolanum triplinervium C.V.MortonSolanum triquetrum Cav. – Texas nightshadeSolanum trisectum DunalSolanum triste Jacq. Enum.Solanum triunfense S. Knapp, 2015 Solanum trizygum BitterSolanum troyanum Urb.Solanum truncatum Standl. & C.V.MortonSolanum truncicolum Bitter
T Solanum tuberosum L. – potatoSolanum tudununggae SymonSolanum tuerckheimii Greenm.Solanum tumulicola SymonSolanum tunariense KuntzeSolanum turgidum S.KnappSolanum turneroides ChodatSolanum turraeaefolium S.MooreSolanum tweedianum Hook.

USolanum uleanum BitterSolanum ultimum A.R.BeanSolanum umalilaense Manoko, 2012Solanum umbellatum Mill.Solanum umbelliferum Eschsch. – bluewitch nightshadeSolanum umbratile J.R.Johnst.Solanum uncinellum Lindl.Solanum undatum Lam.Solanum unifoliatum S.KnappSolanum unilobum (Rusby) BohsSolanum urens DunalSolanum urosepalum DammerSolanum ursinum Rusby
T Solanum urubambae Juz.Solanum usambarense Bitter & DammerSolanum usaramense Dammer

 V Solanum vacciniiflorum Standl. & L.O.WilliamsSolanum vaccinioides Schltr.Solanum vagans C.H.WrightSolanum vaillantii DunalSolanum valdiviense DunalSolanum valerianum C.V.Morton & Standl.Solanum validinervium Benitez & S.KnappSolanum vansittartense C.A.GardnerSolanum variabile Mart.Solanum velleum Thunb.Solanum vellozianum DunalSolanum velutinum DunalSolanum velutissimum RusbySolanum venosum DunalSolanum verecundum M.Nee
T Solanum vernei Bitter & Wittm.
T Solanum verrucosum Schltdl.Solanum versicolor A.R.BeanSolanum verticillatum S. Knapp & Stehmann, 2015 Solanum vescum MuellerSolanum vespertilio AitonSolanum vestissimum DunalSolanum viarum DunalSolanum vicinum A.R.BeanSolanum villosum Mill. – yellow nightshadeSolanum violaceum Ortega Solanum virginianum L.Solanum viride Spreng. – green nightshadeSolanum viridifolium DunalSolanum viscosissimum Sendtn.Solanum volubile Sw.

WSolanum wackettii WitasekSolanum wallacei (A.Gray) Parish – Wallace's nightshade, Catalina nightshade, Clokey's nightshade, "wild tomato" (including S. clokeyi)Solanum warmingii HiernSolanum watneyi Chris Martine —  Australian bush tomato, named after fictional character Mark Watney from "The Martian" novel and film. Solanum welwitschii C.H.WrightSolanum wendlandii Hook.f.Solanum whalenii M.NeeSolanum wightii NeesSolanum wittei RobynsSolanum woodburyi Howard – Woodbury's nightshadeSolanum woodii Särkinen & S. Knapp, 2016 
T Solanum woodsonii Correll.Solanum wrightii Benth.

 X Solanum xanthophaeum BitterSolanum xanti A.Gray – purple nightshade, San Diego nightshade

Y
T Solanum yamobambense Ochoa.Solanum yanamonense S.KnappSolanum yirrkalense SymonSolanum youngii S.Knapp
T Solanum yungasense Hawkes.

ZSolanum zanzibarense Vatke.

 Hybrid taxa (nothospecies) 
T Solanum × ajanhuiri Juz. & Bukasov.
T Solanum × arahuayum Ochoa.
T Solanum × blanco-galdosii Ochoa.
T Solanum × brucheri Correll.
T Solanum × chaucha Juz. & Bukasov
T Solanum × curtilobum Juz. & BukasovSolanum × edinense Berthault.
T Solanum × michoacanum (Bitter)
T Solanum × neoweberbaueri Wittm.Solanum × procurrens A.C.Leslie
T Solanum × ruiz-lealia BrücherSolanum × sambucinum Rydb.
T Solanum × sucrense Hawkes.Solanum × vallis-mexici Juz.
T Solanum × viirsooi K.A.Okada & A.M.Clausen

Notes

 References 

 Bibliography 

 Nee, M. Index of Solanum names. Planetary Biodiversity Inventories (PBI), SolanaceaSource.  
 
 Knapp, S. 2002. Solanum Section Geminata (Solanaceae). In: Organization for Flora Neotropica, ed., Fl. Neotrop. Monogr. 84.
 
 United States Department of Agriculture, Agricultural Research Service, Beltsville Area Germplasm Resources Information Network (GRIN). 2006. Solanum''. 
 

List
Solanum